Lemuel Paynter (1788 – August 1, 1863) was a Democratic member of the U.S. House of Representatives from Pennsylvania.

Life and career
Lemuel Paynter was born in Lewes, Delaware. He moved to Philadelphia, Pennsylvania, and served in the War of 1812 and became major and lieutenant colonel of the Ninety-third Regiment, Pennsylvania Militia. He served as a member of the board of commissioners of the Southwark district for many years and also served as a president of the board. He was a member of the guardians of the poor and also a school director. He was elected a member of the Pennsylvania State Senate in 1833.

Congress
Paynter was elected as a Democrat to the Twenty-fifth and Twenty-sixth Congresses. He was not a candidate for renomination in 1840. He again served as a member of the board of commissioners of the Southwark district.

Death
He died in Philadelphia in 1863. Interment in Union Sixth Street Cemetery which was closed in 1971 and his remains moved to Philadelphia Memorial Park in Frazer, Pennsylvania.

Sources

The Political Graveyard

1788 births
1863 deaths
Democratic Party Pennsylvania state senators
Politicians from Philadelphia
American militiamen in the War of 1812
Democratic Party members of the United States House of Representatives from Pennsylvania
People from Lewes, Delaware
19th-century American politicians
American militia officers